The Happiest Millionaire (complete title Count Basie Captures Walt Disney's The Happiest Millionaire) is an album by pianist and bandleader Count Basie and His Orchestra featuring performances of tunes featured in Walt Disney's motion picture The Happiest Millionaire recorded in 1967 and released on the Coliseum label.

Track listing
All compositions by Richard M. Sherman and Robert B. Sherman
 "Detroit" 	
 "Strengthen the Dwelling" 	
 "I'll Always be Irish" 	
 "Valentine Candy" 	
 "Bye-Yum-Pum-Pum" 	
 "Watch Your Footwork" 	
 "What's Wrong with That" 	
 "Let's Have a Drink on It" 	
 "Are We Dancing" 	
 "Fortuosity"
Recorded  at A & R Recording in New York on October 4, 1967 (tracks 1, 2 & 5), October 5, 1967 (tracks 6, 8 & 10) and October 6, 1967 (tracks 3, 4, 7 & 9)

Personnel 
Count Basie - piano
Al Aarons, Sonny Cohn, Gene Goe, Sam Noto  - trumpet
Richard Boone, Harlan Floyd, Grover Mitchell - trombone
Bill Hughes - bass trombone
Bobby Plater - alto saxophone, flute
Marshal Royal - alto saxophone, clarinet
Eric Dixon - tenor saxophone, flute 
Eddie "Lockjaw" Davis - tenor saxophone
Charlie Fowlkes - baritone saxophone
Freddie Green - guitar
Norman Keenan  - bass
Louis Bellson - drums
Chico O'Farrill - arranger

References 

1967 albums
Count Basie Orchestra albums
Albums produced by Teddy Reig
Albums arranged by Chico O'Farrill